Jim Drake (1929 – 2012) was an American aeronautical engineer who is widely credited with the invention of the sport of Windsurfing. He patented his windsurfing concept in 1968. Drake conceptualized, designed and hand built the first board and articulating sail rig prototype in his garage. He started the sport's first company, Windsurfing International. He produced multiple championship winning windsurfing board designs throughout his career, as well as created a popular offshoot of windsurfing with the world's first un-masted wing sail. Drake would go on to become an altruistic figure head for the sport he pioneered over the course of his lifetime.

Aeronautics career 
Drake earned a bachelor's degree in mechanical engineering with an option in aeronautics from Stanford university in 1951. He began his aeronautical engineering career at North American Aviation in his hometown of Los Angeles, California. There he worked in the advanced design group as a principal engineer on a number of top secret record breaking experimental aircraft. Notable among his aircraft designs at North American were the X-15 rocket plane, which broke altitude and speed records for manned flight, and the B-70 high altitude bomber. He later worked for Rockwell and their division RAND Corporation. He helped found the think tank R&D Associates (RDA), a technical studies firm. His career took him to The Pentagon for various periods both directly and indirectly, part of which was associated with the development of improved Intercontinental Ballistic Missiles and Tomahawk missiles during the Cold War of the 1960s and 70's. Drake retired from his aeronautical engineering career in 1998 after 47 years of elite level design work.

Invention of windsurfing 

Jim Drake first began conceptualizing the idea of windsurfing in 1962 along with close friend, sailor and fellow aeronautical engineer Fred Payne. They wanted to combine the portability and ease of skiing with the joys of sailing. In their spare time together, while away from their high level aerospace engineering jobs, they played with the idea for fun. Drake's career as a successful aeronautical engineer was thriving by this time, in part, because he enjoyed the mental challenge of "solving a technical puzzle." Then in 1966, at a small dinner party in Santa Monica, California, Drake casually mentioned his idea of creating a sail powered surfboard to a family friend named Hoyle Schweitzer. He shared with Schweitzer his idea of creating a new type of portable sail craft, whereby the sailor stood upright on a large surfboard while holding directly onto a small sail.  

Drake's question came down to simple operation of how a standing person could control both the power of the sail as well as the direction of the craft without a rudder. Drake discovered that one's ability to rotate the sail's position relative to the board could allow control of both power and direction. Experimenting with a rotational design, he invented the concept for the universal joint. Drake completed his engineering concept with a wishbone boom, a daggerboard, mast, mast foot, triangular sail and fin.  

Upon hearing Drake's concept, Schweitzer was immediately enthusiastic about the profitable business potential. From the outset, the two men were motivated by different forces. As a struggling computer program salesman, Schweitzer eagerly sought to partner with Drake in order to capitalize on the friendly engineer's brilliant sailboard concept. Once a partnership was forged, Schweitzer quickly moved to secure a joint patent on Drake's invention. Once a joint patent was obtained, Schweitzer then went full steam ahead with starting a company called Windsurfing International. As a partnership, Drake was the inventor, Schweitzer was the salesman. 

Years later, in 2002, the Professional Windsurfing Association (PWA) upon inducting both Drake and Schweitzer into the inaugural class of the Windsurfing Hall of Fame, called Drake "The father of windsurfing" and Schweitzer "The man who brought windsurfing to the masses." Windsurfing's origin story has long and often been misconstrued through the lens of popular media and personal bias. The convenient and romanticized storyline of a sailor and a surfer, combining their two respective sports into a single new sport is idealized and not historically fact-based. More accurately, it was the combination of an intrepid, highly skilled engineer and a motivated, out of work businessman that together created the modern sport of windsurfing. Drake stated repeatedly, in various interviews, that although he alone can probably be credited with the entire invention, without Schweitzer playing a key motivating role he may never have completed the engineering design phase and moved forward with building and testing the original prototype.  Patent disputes in the 1980s uncovered earlier sailboard designs by Peter Chilvers and Newman Darby such that Drake accepted that he was the third inventor of the concept.

Drake's first prototype 

Drake was an elite engineer as well as talented craftsman throughout his lifetime. Drake first engineered the simulation  for his windsurfer concept on paper then crafted nearly all of the windsurfer prototype components by hand in his Santa Monica, California home garage in January 1967.  He built the wishbone boom, daggerboard and mast foot from laminated teak wood. He designed and built a custom wood press jig for shaping the curve into the wishbone boom. His universal joint design was created by reconfiguring a commercially available sailboat swivel joint; constructed from heavy duty marine stainless steel with a teflon core component. Drake custom engineered the first sail, which was made of Dacron sail cloth. It formed a triangular Bermuda rig cut and was sewn by sail maker Bob Broussard. The custom board, the size of a large tandem surfboard, was designed by Drake and shaped from an oversized foam blank by shaper Gary Seaman at the Santa Monica-based surfboard factory of Con Surfboards.  A repurposed hollow fiberglass  mast from a small racing dingy was used to support the sail. Schweitzer's contribution to the project was primarily financial and non-technical. Drake was the concept's design engineer who knew what specifications the sail craft required and what materials were needed to build it. Drake instructed Schweitzer to purchase specific items and where to go to purchase those items, including the large foam tandem surfboard blank, and the hollow fiberglass mast.

Drake's first day 

On May 21, 1967, Drake, along with his wife Wendy and daughter Stephanie, went to Marina del Rey, California's Jamaica Bay to make history with the world's first modern sailboard session. The Drake's were met by Broussard, the sailmaker, who happened to be passing by on his bicycle.  Drake admits he had carefully thought through many of the complex ideas of control, but overlooked the simple need of raising the sail out of the water to begin sailing. He had always imagined the rider standing on the board with the sail in their hands and hadn't thought about how he would raise the sail from the water, so on that historic first day got Broussard to wade into the water to lift it out from the water and hand it to him. Complicating his first day's test run further was the fact that Drake forgot the skeg at home. Returning to Marina del Rey one week later, this time with the skeg and uphaul, Drake succeeded at sailing the board the way he designed it to be used. With his confidence buoyed from two days of practice, Drake took his sailboard onto the open ocean at Will Rogers State Beach in Santa Monica, California. On the sport's third day Drake taught Schweitzer how to windsurf.

Follow the link below to watch a short film created by Drake's wife Wendy of that first day's historic session:

Jim Drake teaching himself windsurfing.

Naming the brand and the sport 
Drake and Schweitzer were impressed enough by the performance of the  prototype to allow a launch party for what they had unofficially called the "Skate." However, they found another company had already used the name "Skate" and were preparing to copyright it, so decided on the name "Baja Board" based on the location where Drake and Schweitzer often used their new craft. In late 1967 and early 1968, Schweitzer was showing a prototype of the "Baja Board" in Seattle, when a public relations man named Bert Salisbury stopped his car to have a look, and commented: "Gee I have the perfect name for it! Windsurfing!" The sport thereafter became known as windsurfing and the first brand was called the Windsurfer. 

The details of Jim Drake's original designs are available in Drake's elegant, scientifically prepared Rand publication, WIND SURFING - A NEW CONCEPT IN SAILING, and this INTERVIEW WITH JIM DRAKE. Despite over 50 years of subsequent development, the design is still remarkably similar to today's windsurfing equipment.

Windsurfing International 
Subsequently, in early 1968, Drake and Schweitzer unofficially, as friends, founded the company Windsurfing International in Southern California to manufacture, promote and license Drake's Windsurfer design. Drake's Santa Monica home address, the place where he had invented windsurfing, was listed as their business's first address. Soon after their "gentleman's handshake deal" Drake was asked by his employer to temporarily relocate himself and his family to the other side of the country to serve as a top level air and space engineer at the Pentagon in Washington DC. Unfortunately Mr. Drake, never signed a formal legal agreement with Mr. Schweitzer, which opened the door for Schweitzer to legally incorporate Windsurfing International as a firm without including Drake as a partner. Drake believed that because he and Schweitzer were joined on the patent that they also were partners at Windsurfing International, and he further believed that because his relation to Schweitzer and his family was warm, cordial and trusting that Schweitzer would act in good faith to protect and foster Drake's interests in their young sport while he was away for two years on other important business. Drake learned the hard way that business can quickly erode relationships. Schweitzer signed lucrative contacts and collected royalty fees to license the production of over 100,000 Windsurfers in Europe without ever informing Drake or sharing any of the proceeds. 

Soon Schweitzer's computer programming business collapsed and producing and selling Windsurfers through Windsurfing International became his financial lifeline. At the same time Drake's aeronautical engineering career was quickly accelerating. Schweitzer, seeking 100% of the licensing fees for each windsurfer produced, wanted Drake's name off from the patent. Drake's full attention was being given to his family and engineering career when Schweitzer started aggressively pressuring him to sell his half of the patent. Drake was surprised by the situation and did not want to sell his interest in the sailboard he had alone invented, however being extremely busy with his engineering career and raising 6 children, in addition to feeling sympathetic to his former friend, Drake reluctantly sold his half of the patent to Windsurfing International for the sum of $36,000, and in doing so kindly allowed Schweitzer to create a profitable business opportunity for himself.

Development of new designs 
Drake never stopped innovating. He continued to design cutting edge windsurfing equipment throughout his entire lifetime. During the 1980s and 1990s he produced a wide range of custom board shapes that challenged the status quo and introduced revolutionary short and wide as well as long and narrow board concepts to the sport.   

See Drake's physics of windsurfing here.  

Drake is also credited as one of the primary inventors of a widely popular offshoot of windsurfing now called "winging." In 1981 Drake and European windsurfing pioneer,Ullirich Stanciu, together invented the first hand held wing used on a sailboard. Their concept was based on the symmetrical shape of the flying fish. Unlike windsurfing, their wing rig was hand held and not fixed to the board via a mast. They applied for a patent on their concept, but prior art was discovered.  

In 1998 Drake met Svein Rassmussen, owner of the windsurfing company Starboard. The two began a productive, successful and award-winning design collaboration. At Starboard, Drake and Rassmussen developed an entirely new class of board design known as "formula".  The formula board is a short and wide light wind race design that uses a very long and narrow skeg. When combined with a large sail, the formula board allows a sailor to reach relatively high planing speed with only a minimal amount of wind. Drake's advanced aerodynamic and hydrodynamic engineering ability provided the needed skill set to produce Starboard's world leading boards such as the Formula 175, Apollo, Gemini, Serenity, Hypersonic and Fish among others. Most recently, Drake helped develop the short, wide race designs that led to the Starboard IQ foil class boards being used in the 2024 olympic games.  

Drake produced a number of "outside the box" new designs that provided World Champions as well as the average windsurfing participant with better options for their needs. Many say he once again "re-invented" the sport of windsurfing with his tandem, short and wide as well as long and narrow board designs. 

Early in the Stand Up Paddle board evolution, Drake was highly influential through his contributions to Starboard with a number of highly successful shapes in both recreational and racing SUP design.  

Jim Drake lived a richly rewarding and influential life. His contributions to Aerospace, Windsurfing, SUP and Winging will have a deep and lasting impact.

Death 
Drake died peacefully on June 19, 2012, from complications of lung disease, at his home in Pfafftown, North Carolina.

References

External links 
Early video taken by Jim Drake's wife at Marina del Ray of Drake teaching himself how to windsurf

1929 births
2012 deaths
Engineers from California
American aerospace engineers
Windsurfing